

This is intended to be a detailed table of the properties on the National Register of Historic Places in Holmes County, Florida, United States.  The location of the National Register property for which the latitude and longitude coordinates are included below, may be seen in a map.

There are 2 properties listed on the National Register in the county.

Current listing

|}

See also

 List of National Historic Landmarks in Florida
 National Register of Historic Places listings in Florida

References

 
Holmes County